The Jegrička (Serbian Cyrillic: Јегричка; Hungarian: Egres; German: Egresch) is a river in northern Serbia, in the Bačka region of the Vojvodina province, a  right tributary to the Tisa river.

Geography 

The Jegrička is samica ("lone river"), or the river that has no spring as such, but it forms from several natural draining canals from the marshes. It originates south of the Pivnice village, in the central Bačka. The river flows in the eastern direction whole of its course. It passes next to the villages of Despotovo, Ravno Selo, Zmajevo and Sirig, parallel to the Canal Danube-Tisa-Danube and Mali Kanal. The river continues eastward, on the northern side of the Jurišna humka hillock and empties into the Tisa.

The Jegrička used to be a slow, intermittent water flow, connecting a series of marshes and bogs which in the periods of high waters spilled over and flew like a real river, reaching the Tisa. Today, the complete first section of the river bed is channelled. In the next  the river is preserved in its natural shape while the last  are used for fish ponds.

Protection 

In 2003 the river was placed under the preliminary environmental protection, and the Jegrička Nature Park was established in 2005. In the late 2000s the sections of the river which flow through the settlements, like Ravno Selo and Zmajevo, were dredged and cleaned from silt, while the banks were adapted into the esplanades with the benches, gazebos and tables. But by 2011 the river was clogged with the garbage again. The water in the park is threatened by the domestic waste, sewage water, cutting and burning of the reed, drainage of the pesticides from the surrounding fields and poaching.

The river is known for the large carpets of white water lilies. Other species include marsh fern and greater bladderwort. The river is rich in different fish species, amphibians, reptiles and mammals. It host different species of water fowl and is home to the endangered Ferruginous duck. The river is rich in common carp, northern pike, wels catfish and zander and a section of the river is transformed into the Jegrička fish pond. The section of the park is declared an important bird area.

References

Sources 
 Jovan Đ. Marković (1990): Enciklopedijski geografski leksikon Jugoslavije; Svjetlost-Sarajevo; 
 Decision of the preliminary protection of the natural property Jegrička, Institute for natural protection, 17 December 2003

External links 

Rivers of Serbia
Geography of Vojvodina
Bačka